Ceres Township is a township in McKean County, Pennsylvania, United States.  The population was 836 at the 2020 census.

Geography

Demographics

As of the census of 2000, there were 1,003 people, 381 households, and 286 families residing in the township.  The population density was 24.6 people per square mile (9.5/km2).  There were 475 housing units at an average density of 11.7/sq mi (4.5/km2).  The racial makeup of the township was 98.40% White, 0.60% Native American, and 1.00% from two or more races.

There were 381 households, out of which 30.4% had children under the age of 18 living with them, 68.0% were married couples living together, 4.7% had a female householder with no husband present, and 24.7% were non-families. 20.7% of all households were made up of individuals, and 9.7% had someone living alone who was 65 years of age or older.  The average household size was 2.63 and the average family size was 3.05.

In the township the population was spread out, with 25.1% under the age of 18, 7.6% from 18 to 24, 26.9% from 25 to 44, 26.7% from 45 to 64, and 13.7% who were 65 years of age or older.  The median age was 39 years. For every 100 females, there were 103.4 males.  For every 100 females age 18 and over, there were 95.1 males.

The median income for a household in the township was $34,107, and the median income for a family was $41,161. Males had a median income of $31,083 versus $19,861 for females. The per capita income for the township was $13,934.  About 6.6% of families and 9.9% of the population were below the poverty line, including 9.8% of those under age 18 and 3.8% of those age 65 or over.

References

Populated places established in 1798
Townships in McKean County, Pennsylvania
Townships in Pennsylvania